Henry Lee Scarborough House, also known as Scarborough Homeplace, is a historic home located at Sumter, Sumter County, South Carolina. It was built in 1908–1909, and is a two-story, three bay, frame Neo-Classical style dwelling. It features a full height portico supported by four massive columns with Corinthian order capitals.

It was added to the National Register of Historic Places in 1995.

This home was acquired in 2015 by attorney Willie H. Brunson. It is the current location of the Brunson Law Firm, LLC.

References

Houses on the National Register of Historic Places in South Carolina
Neoclassical architecture in South Carolina
Houses completed in 1909
Houses in Sumter County, South Carolina
National Register of Historic Places in Sumter County, South Carolina